Ballydavid is a townland in the civil parish of Twomileborris, County Tipperary.

References

Townlands of County Tipperary